The descending genicular artery (also known as the highest genicular artery) arises from the femoral artery just before its passage through the adductor hiatus.

The descending geniculate artery immediately divides into two branches: a saphenous branch (which classically joins with the medial inferior genicular artery), and muscular and articular branches.

Structure

Branches

Saphenous branch 
The saphenous branch pierces the aponeurotic covering of the adductor canal, and accompanies the saphenous nerve to the medial side of the knee. It passes between the sartorius muscle and the gracilis muscle, and, piercing the fascia lata, is distributed to the integument of the upper and medial part of the leg, anastomosing with the medial inferior genicular artery.

Articular branches 
The articular branches descend within the vastus medialis muscle, and in front of the tendon of the adductor magnus muscle, to the medial side of the knee, where they join with the medial superior genicular and anterior recurrent tibial artery.

A branch from this vessel crosses above the patellar surface of the femur, forming an anastomotic arch with the lateral superior genicular artery, and supplying branches to the knee-joint.

References

External links

Arteries of the lower limb